The 2022 Copa CONMEBOL Sudamericana was the 21st edition of the CONMEBOL Sudamericana (also referred to as the Copa Sudamericana), South America's secondary club football tournament organized by CONMEBOL.

On 14 May 2020, CONMEBOL announced the candidate venues for the 2021, 2022 and 2023 club competition finals. On 13 May 2021, CONMEBOL's Council decided that the final would be played at the Estádio Nacional Mané Garrincha in Brasília, Brazil on 1 October 2022. However, on 23 June 2022 the confederation announced that a change of venue was requested by the Brazilian Football Confederation due to the 2022 Brazilian general election taking place one day after the date of the final, and confirmed Estadio Mario Alberto Kempes in Córdoba, Argentina as the new host for the match.

On 25 November 2021, CONMEBOL announced the abolition of the away goals rule in all of its club competitions including the Copa Sudamericana, which had been used since 2005. Accordingly, if in a two-legged tie two teams score the same amount of aggregate goals, the winner of the tie would not be decided by the number of away goals scored by each team but by a penalty shoot-out.

Ecuadorian club Independiente del Valle won their second title in the competition after defeating Brazilian side São Paulo by a 2–0 score in the final. As winners of the 2022 Copa Sudamericana, they earned the right to play against the winners of the 2022 Copa Libertadores in the 2023 Recopa Sudamericana and they also automatically qualified for the 2023 Copa Libertadores group stage. Athletico Paranaense were the previous champions, but did not defend their title since they qualified for the 2022 Copa Libertadores group stage as Copa Sudamericana champions and later advanced to the knockout stage.

Teams
The following 44 teams from the 10 CONMEBOL associations qualified for the tournament:
Argentina and Brazil: 6 berths each
All other associations: 4 berths each

The entry stage is determined as follows:
 Group stage: 12 teams (teams from Argentina and Brazil)
 First stage: 32 teams (teams from all other associations)

Notes

A further 12 teams eliminated from the 2022 Copa Libertadores were transferred to the Copa Sudamericana, entering the group stage and the round of 16.

Schedule
The schedule of the competition is as follows:

Draws

First stage

Group stage

Group A

Group B

Group C

Group D

Group E

Group F

Group G

Group H

Final stages

Seeding

Bracket

Round of 16

Quarter-finals

Semi-finals

Final

Statistics

Top scorers

See also
2022 Copa Libertadores

References

External links
CONMEBOL Sudamericana 2022, CONMEBOL.com
CONMEBOL Sudamericana

 
2022
1